Riverbend High School is a public secondary school located in Spotsylvania, Virginia, and is part of Spotsylvania County Public Schools. Opened in 2004, Riverbend is Spotsylvania County's newest high school. The school mascot is a bear and the school colors are royal blue and emerald green.
The high school has an enrollment of around 2,000 students in grades 9-12.

Athletics

Riverbend High School is part of the AAA Commonwealth District and offers volleyball, boys' and girls' tennis, lacrosse, cross country, boys' and girls' soccer, field hockey, cheerleading, football, golf, boys' and girls' basketball, wrestling, swimming, baseball, softball, and spring track and field.

The girls' soccer team defeated Courtland 2–0 for the 2007 AA VHSL state title.

Riverbend High School was home to Billy Harris, a three time Free Lance-Star Tennis Player of the Year. He won 4 district titles, three AA and one AAA.

Performing arts

Band
Under the current direction of Zachary Wadsworth, the Riverbend Bands have been performing since the school's opening in 2004. An advanced honors band for those interested in other music is the Left Bank Jazz Ensemble, which performs at concerts and go on a field trip in December to  Wilderness ES and Brock Road ES for a Christmas Tour.

See also
 List of high schools in Virginia
 AAA Commonwealth District

References

External links
 School website
 Spotsylvania County Schools Website

Public high schools in Virginia
Spotsylvania County Public Schools
Educational institutions established in 2004
2004 establishments in Virginia